Timber Creek is a stream in the U.S. state of South Dakota.

Timber Creek's name comes from the Sioux Indians of the area, for the variety of trees growing along the creek.

See also
List of rivers of South Dakota

References

Rivers of Meade County, South Dakota
Rivers of South Dakota